Wyble is a surname. Notable people with the surname include:

Jimmy Wyble (1922–2010), American guitarist
Teri Wyble, American actress

See also
WIBL
WYBL